Windows Cyrillic + German is a modification of Windows-1251 that was used by Paratype to cover languages that use the Cyrillic script such as Russian, Bulgarian, and Serbian Cyrillic on a German language keyboard. This encoding was also used by Gamma Productions (now Unitype). This encoding is supported by FontLab Studio 5.

Character set
The following table shows Windows Cyrillic + German. Each character is shown with its Unicode equivalent and its decimal code.

References 

Windows code pages